Winston Van Cuylenburg (born 11 January 1943) is a former Sri Lankan bantamweight and featherweight boxer.

He competed at the 1964 Summer Olympics in Tokyo in the flyweight class, representing Sri Lanka, where he knocked out Lee Kam Wah from Hong Kong in the second round of their match. In his next match Van Cuylenburg was defeated by Romanian, Constantin CiucÄ, in a points decision. CiucÄ qualified for the quarterfinals, where he was defeated by Artur Olech, from Poland (the eventual silver medalist).

References

External links
 
 
 
 Profile at Amateur boxing

1943 births
Living people
Sri Lankan male boxers
Olympic boxers of Sri Lanka
Boxers at the 1964 Summer Olympics
Flyweight boxers